Chupungnyeong is a mountain pass between Yeongdong-gun, Chungcheongbuk-do and Gimcheon-si, Gyeongsangbuk-do in South Korea.

Summary 

It lies in the Sobaek Mountains, and it was a border between Jinhan and Mahan in Proto–Three Kingdoms period and Silla and Baekje in Three Kingdoms period. Now it is a border between Chungcheongbuk-do and Gyeongsangbuk-do, Hoseo and Yeongnam. Korail Gyeongbu Line, Route 4 and Gyeongbu Expressway pass through it, and it is the highest point in Gyeongbu Line. There is a meteorological observatory controlled by Daejeon Area Meteorological Administration. As a name of administrative divisions, it is one of myeon in Yeongdong-gun and ri in Chupungnyeong-myeon.

Around 

 Gyeongbu Line – Chupungnyeong station
 Gyeongbu Expressway Chupungnyeong IC/SA
 Chupungnyeong Meteorological Observatory

Climate

Chupungnyeong has a humid continental climate (Köppen climate classification Dwa) with very warm summers and cold winters. Precipitation is much higher in summer than in winter.

References

Landforms of North Chungcheong Province
Landforms of North Gyeongsang Province
Mountain passes of South Korea
Sobaek Mountains